Woodmere is a station on the Long Island Rail Road's Far Rockaway Branch in Woodmere, in the Town of Hempstead in Nassau County, New York, United States. The station is located at Woodmere Boulevard and Cedar Lane, between Central Avenue and West Broadway.

History
Woodmere station was originally built by the South Side Railroad of Long Island in 1869. Depending on the source, it was established in either July or October. It was originally listed on SSRRLI's timetable as "Wood's station," then "Woodsburgh" before being given its current name. The station was discontinued on July 13, 1872, but reestablished on January 16, 1885. Beginning in May 1885, the station also included the Cedarhurst Railway, a trolley line to Lawrence along the border of Hewlett Harbor at the coast of Brosewere Bay for approximately 10 years.

The second depot was built in 1902, and was electrified with the rest of the line three years later. The 1902-built station originally had a canopy above the Valley Stream-bound platform, that extended southwest of the station house, and another one above Cedar Lane designed to protect horse carriage passengers from rain, snow, and other inclement weather. A freight house also existed across the tracks. The canopy for horse carriages was abandoned around 1939. The track-side covered platforms were removed with the installation of high-level platforms sometime around 1968. Aside from these modifications, the station still exists as it was built in 1902.

Station layout
This station has two high-level side platforms, each 10 car-lengths.

References

External links 

Old Woodmere Station (Arrt's Arrchives)
 Station from Woodmere Boulevard from Google Maps Street View
 Platforms from Google Maps Street View
 Waiting room from Google Maps Street View

Five Towns
Long Island Rail Road stations in Nassau County, New York
Railway stations in the United States opened in 1869
1869 establishments in New York (state)